Louis LeBel  (born November 30, 1939) is a former puisne justice of the Supreme Court of Canada. He served on the Court from 2000 to 2014.

LeBel was born in Quebec City. He is the son of lawyer Paul LeBel, Q.C.

He went to school at the Collège des Jésuites, graduating with a BA in 1958. LeBel earned his law degree at Université Laval in 1962 and went on to get an LL.M from the University of Toronto in 1966. He was a top student, winning the Governor General's medal, the Lieutenant General's medal and the Tessier silver medal.

He was called to the bar in 1962 and practised in Quebec City in several firms until 1984. During this period he taught at the University of Ottawa and Université Laval.

On June 28, 1984, he was appointed directly to the Quebec Court of Appeal. He stayed on the Court until he was appointed by Jean Chrétien to the Supreme Court in 2000.

He is married to Louise Poudrier since August 28, 1965. His wife is also a lawyer and taught at Université Laval until 2000. They have three children: Paul, Catherine and François, who was appointed a judge of the Court of Quebec in 2018.

See also
 Reasons of the Supreme Court of Canada by Justice LeBel

References 

Companions of the Order of Canada
Justices of the Supreme Court of Canada
Lawyers in Quebec
University of Toronto alumni
University of Toronto Faculty of Law alumni
Université Laval alumni
People from Quebec City
1939 births
Living people
Université Laval Faculté de droit alumni
Academic staff of the University of Ottawa